The Mutant Way is comedy panel program on Channel 31 Melbourne. Produced by DeakinTV, The Mutant Way consists of two panels pitted against each other, as they battle it out through a series of challenges in order to make you laugh so hard your cheeks hurt. Each week, two panels are made up of our regular weekly panelists (improvisers) who are then joined by two special guests. In 2010, the show won two Antenna Awards for 'Outstanding Comedy Program' and 'Outstanding Excellence in Technical Innovation'.

Cast roles

Australian community access television shows
2009 Australian television series debuts
2009 Australian television series endings
Television shows set in Victoria (Australia)